James H. "Jay" Hughes (January 22, 1874 – June 2, 1924) was an American Major League Baseball pitcher who played four seasons from  to .

Career
Hughes was born in Sacramento, California, in 1874. He attracted attention in 1897 when he threw a three-hit shutout during a west coast exhibition game against the famed Baltimore Orioles, a team featuring such notable baseball stars as Wilbert Robinson, John McGraw, Hughie Jennings, Willie Keeler, and Joe Kelley. Orioles manager Ned Hanlon hired him and brought him east, where he played four seasons.

Hughes started his National League (NL) career with two consecutive shutouts, a feat that would not be achieved again by an NL rookie until Al Worthington did so for the New York Giants in 1953. Hughes pitched a no-hitter on April 22, 1898 (another no-hitter, by Cincinnati's Ted Breitenstein, was thrown the same day, marking the first time that two no-hitters were thrown on the same day). Jennings, Keeler, and several other key Orioles were transferred, including manager Hanlon, who had an ownership stake. Hughes won a league-leading 28 games for the 1899 Superbas.

As a Sacramento native, he disliked pitching in the east, and on several occasions refused to sign contracts with eastern clubs so he could remain on the west coast. In 1903, playing for the Seattle Rainiers, he tied Doc Newton for the lead in wins with 34, including 12 in a row from September 8 through November 4. Hughes pitched there until a back injury ended his career.

Hughes died in 1924 when he fell from a train in Sacramento, fracturing his skull. He was laid to rest at St. Joseph Cemetery in Sacramento.

See also
 List of Major League Baseball annual wins leaders
 List of Major League Baseball no-hitters

References

External links

 Baseball Almanac
 The Baseball Library

1874 births
1924 deaths
19th-century baseball players
Major League Baseball pitchers
National League wins champions
Baltimore Orioles (NL) players
Brooklyn Superbas players
Sacramento Gilt Edges players
Victoria Chappies players
Seattle Siwashes players
Sacramento Cordovas players
San Francisco Seals (baseball) players
Santa Clara Broncos baseball coaches
Baseball players from Sacramento, California
American Roman Catholics
Accidental deaths from falls
Accidental deaths in California
Railway accident deaths in the United States